Mouchnice is a municipality and village in Hodonín District in the South Moravian Region of the Czech Republic. It has about 300 inhabitants.

Gallery

References

Villages in Hodonín District